John Francis Allen Jr. (August 23, 1900 – July 20, 1988), nicknamed "Hap", was an American Negro league infielder in the 1920s.

A native of Pittsburgh, Pennsylvania, Allen made his Negro leagues debut in 1921 with the Pittsburgh Keystones and played for the Homestead Grays the following season. He died in Pittsburgh in 1988 at age 87.

References

External links
 and Seamheads

1900 births
1988 deaths
Homestead Grays players
Pittsburgh Keystones players
Baseball infielders
Baseball players from Pittsburgh
20th-century African-American sportspeople